"Through the Wire" is the debut single by American rapper and producer Kanye West, who wrote and recorded the song with his jaw wired shut after a car crash in October 2002. The song samples Chaka Khan's 1985 single "Through the Fire" and was released on the last day of September 2003 as the lead single from his debut album The College Dropout (2004).

"Through the Wire" peaked at number 15 on the Billboard Hot 100 and received positive reviews from music critics. It was certified Platinum and Gold in the United States and United Kingdom, respectively. The song was nominated for a 2005 Grammy Award for Best Rap Solo Performance, but lost to Jay-Z's "99 Problems". The music video was financed by West, who was inspired by an Adidas advertisement. It won Video of the Year at the 2004 Source Hip Hop Awards.

Background 
On October 23, 2002, West was in a California recording studio producing music for Beanie Sigel, Peedi Crakk, and The Black Eyed Peas. After leaving the studio at around 3 a.m. in his rented Lexus, he had a near-fatal crash when he had fallen asleep at the wheel. He was taken to the Cedars-Sinai Medical Center, mentioned in the song as "the same hospital where Biggie Smalls died," and had his jaw wired to his face in reconstructive surgery. Two weeks after being admitted to the hospital, he recorded the song at the Record Plant Studios with his jaw still wired shut. Consequence recalls West started rapping the lyrics to the song three days after the crash.

The song's title refers to the wires used to hold his broken jaw together. When asked about how the incident changed his music, West stated: 

The song originally appeared on West's mixtape Get Well Soon... where his wired jaw was incredibly noticeable, before being re-recorded and released as the first single from The College Dropout in late 2003. Although he initially had trouble convincing Roc-A-Fella Records executives to let him make his own album as a rapper, he was able to change their minds after the song's release.

Composition 
"Through the Wire" was inspired by the 2002 car crash and West has provided a comedic account of his difficult recovery. West samples a pitch-shifted and sped up version of Chaka Khan's 1985 single "Through the Fire". Coodie, one of the music video's directors, reported that Khan wouldn't initially allow the sample to be cleared until the video was shown to her son and he told Khan about it, leading to the sample being cleared about two weeks later. Khan later expressed her love for the track, calling West a "sweetheart, truly adorable" and the way he used the sample "so clever". However, in June 2019, Khan criticized West's unorthodox, highly pitchshifted use of the sample, calling it "stupid". West did not receive writing credit for the song, which instead went to David Foster, Tom Keane, and Cynthia Weil, who wrote "Through the Fire". West's rapping is described as "a Snoop-meets-Hova flow, twisting up his words with the patented 'izz' inflection."

Release and reception 
Dave Heaton of PopMatters called it "as riveting and moving as everyone says it is" and it "may be the album's most startling personal horror story (though it's also a song of hope and gratitude)". AllMusic's Andy Kellman said it was "a daring way to introduce himself to the masses as an MC" and it "couldn't have forged his dual status as underdog and champion any better." Kellman described the content as "heartbreaking and hysterical" and that despite his "inevitable slur, his words ring loud and clear".

The New York Times Kelefa Sanneh described him as "a wounded hero beating the odds" and it "gave him a chance to prove that he was the exception to the rule that producers can't rap." Stylus Magazine called it "a poignant, pop-culture-packed account of Kanye’s near-fatal run-in with Chaka Khan". By rapping with his jaw sewed up, The Source noted that West used "the element of surprise to his advantage". HipHopDX listed the track as one of "the classics that created" the album's hype, and Pitchfork Media stated it was "chock-full-of-clever". Vibe magazine wrote that "West's sideways approach to music making stands out" on the track and the "raw, teeth-clenching narrative falls in line with his gutwrenching soul beats." At the 2005 Grammy Awards, the track was nominated for Best Rap Solo Performance, which was won by Jay-Z's "99 Problems". The track was one of the Award Winning Songs at the 2005 BMI R&B/Hip-Hop Awards.

As West's debut single, "Through the Wire" has been recognized as a jump-start for his career after the song was played on MTV. Director for the music video, Coodie, would say "The night of when he did the 'Through the Wire' premiere party at 40-40 Club, that was the night that was like, 'Oh shit.' That's when Def Jam started recognizing him. Everybody was blown away by the video and it just kept building from there. Then after that show on SOBs on October 1st, he was bonafide. He was popping. It was full-on Kanye season." Consequence would say to Complex on The College Dropout's 10th anniversary, "The accident wound up being a blessing for him. Whatever diction issues he had, he came through with a super clear voice. That was like one of those pressure bursts pipes things." In 2010 and 2013, Complex would name "Through the Wire" the 10th best rap song from Chicago. Pitchfork included the song in The Pitchfork 500, a 2008 guide to the 500 greatest songs from punk to the present, while Rolling Stone ranked the song at number fourteen on a list of the 100 Greatest Debut Singles of All Time in 2020.

Commercial performance 
"Through the Wire" debuted at number ninety-four on the Billboard Hot 100 and peaked at number fifteen for five weeks. It remained on the chart for twenty-one weeks. It performed better on the urban contemporary charts, reaching number eight on the Hot R&B/Hip-Hop Singles & Tracks and number four on the Hot Rap Tracks. In the United Kingdom, it debuted at number nine on the UK Singles Chart where it peaked for two weeks and exited the chart after nine weeks. The track charted lower in other European countries, where it reached the top thirty in Ireland, Sweden, and the Netherlands, the top fifty in Belgium and Switzerland, and number sixty-one in Germany. Its maximum peak time in those countries lasted one week. The single entered the New Zealand Singles Chart at number twenty-four and peaked at number sixteen.

On July 14, 2017, "Through the Wire" was certified Silver in the UK, nearly fourteen years after the single's release. It was certified Gold on September 10, 2021, over 4 years later and almost 18 years after its initial release. The single was certified Platinum in the US on November 20, 2018, fifteen years after its release.

Music video 
The music video was directed by Coodie and Chike and it premiered on August 3, 2003. It is a slideshow of videos and pictures of West producing and his crash seen through the frames of Polaroid pictures. West, who financed the video, conceived ideas for the clip after seeing an Adidas advertisement in BlackBook magazine. He stated, "I don't like gettin' ideas from direct shit ... I like to pull ideas from all the way over here. Sometimes my vision can't be explained in words, 'cause I couldn't have even told you in words how I envisioned that video ending up." Chike recalled the making of the clip, saying, "one day Coodie calls me out the blue about a concept he and Kanye had for a video revolving around Polaroid snapshots. I was leaving work at 7 PM only to come back at 10 PM, work all night then go home at 7 AM". Coodie stated that "If we would have wrote a treatment" for the video, "they would have shot that down. They had to see it to understand. Otherwise they'd have said, 'No, Kanye should be rapping at a party, with lots of girls poolside'". It was awarded the Video of the Year at the 2004 Source Hip Hop Awards.

Track listing 
CD single
"Through the Wire"
"Through the Wire" (instrumental)
"Two Words" (main)
"Two Words" (clean)
"Two Words" (instrumental)

UK CD single
"Through the Wire" (radio edit)
"Two Words" (radio edit)
"Through the Wire" (instrumental)
"Through the Wire" (multimedia track)

Personnel 
Information adapted from The College Dropout liner notes.
Songwriters: Kanye West, David Foster, Tom Keane, Cynthia Weil
Record producer: Kanye West
Recording engineer: Francis Graham
Mix engineer: Manny Marroquin
Bass guitar: Scott Ward

Charts

Weekly charts

Year-end charts

Certifications

Release history

Notes

References

External links 
Kanye West's official website
"Through the Wire" Lyrics at MTV (archived from 2009)

2003 debut singles
Kanye West songs
Song recordings produced by Kanye West
Songs written by David Foster
Songs written by Kanye West
Roc-A-Fella Records singles
Def Jam Recordings singles
Songs written by Tom Keane (musician)
Songs with lyrics by Cynthia Weil
2003 songs